Travelers Home is an Italian Villa and Queen Anne style home in Sheridan, Oregon, United States. It was built in 1892, and the building was added to the National Register of Historic Places on July 8, 1982. The building, also known as Savage-Mendenhall-Seth House, has been used as both a hotel and residence. The two-story building has a horizontal board style of siding.

References

External links
Oregon Historic Sites Database

Sheridan, Oregon
Hotels in Oregon
National Register of Historic Places in Yamhill County, Oregon
Houses on the National Register of Historic Places in Oregon
Houses in Yamhill County, Oregon
1892 establishments in Oregon